Uncharacterized hematopoietic stem/progenitor cells protein MDS032, also known as MDS032, is a protein which in humans is encoded by the MDS032 gene.

Function 

D12, the mouse homolog of MDS032, is a  SNARE protein involved with the Golgi secretory apparatus and with endosome-lysosome transport.

References

Further reading